Phacusosia is a monotypic moth genus of the family Erebidae. Its only species, Phacusosia xanthosoma, is found in Papua New Guinea. Both the genus and species were described by George Hampson in 1911.

References

Nudariina
Moths described in 1911
Monotypic moth genera